At least four ships have borne the name Irlam.
 was launched at Liverpool and wrecked in 1812.
 was launched at Liverpool and wrecked in 1824.
 was launched at Liverpool and wrecked in 1831.
Irlam was launched at Liverpool after the loss  of the vessel wrecked in 1831.

The same company, Barton & Co. (actually Barton, Irlam and Higginson), owned each of the first three vessels, and each was a West Indiaman, sailing between Liverpool and the West Indies, primarily Barbados. There is too little information on the fourth to be able to confirm or refute the possibility that Barton & Co. also owned it. She did trade between Liverpool and Barbados.

 was a steel steam paddle tug launched at South Shields. She was broken up in 1953.

Notes

Citations

Ship names
Age of Sail merchant ships of England